The men's 3 metre springboard diving competition at the 2015 European Games in Baku took place on 20 June at the Baku Aquatics Centre.

Results
The preliminary round was started at 10:00. The final was held at 20:25.

Green denotes finalists

References

Men's 3 metre springboard